American Latino TV is a nationally syndicated television program produced by American Latino Syndication, a division of LATV Networks. The weekly magazine and culture lifestyle program showcases American and foreign-born Latinos making a positive impact in American society. The program set the standard for highlighting American Latino culture through entertainment, the arts and sciences, education and sports. The show has had various hosts throughout the years including Liza Quin, Belqui Ortiz, Stephanie Ortiz, Jeannette Sandoval, Julian Dujarric, Daisy Fuentes, Valery Ortiz and is currently hosted by Carolina Trejos.

American Latino TV can be seen weekly in over 100 cities in over 92% of U.S. Hispanic homes (and 65% of all TV homes) across the U.S. on a number of TV affiliates, as well as in reruns on cable networks. Segments from the show can also be seen on the Internet and the show is broadcast internationally in the Virgin Islands, Puerto Rico and in parts of Canada bordering the U.S. The show often airs in tandem with its sister program LatiNation and has also spawned a series of specials titled American Latino Presents and The American Latino Awards.

Format

The show is a half-hour culture and entertainment magazine with 4–5 segments ranging from 1:30–3:30 minutes in length. The segments include music, fashion, culture, celebrity interviews and inspirational stories of regular people doing extraordinary things.

Hosts 
 Celines Toribio (2002 Urban Latino TV)
 Johnny Salgado (2002–04 Urban Latino TV) 
 Noemi (2002–04 Urban Latino TV)
 Liza Quin (2004–2007) 
 Cristina Fernandez (2004–2007)
 Belqui Ortiz (2007–08)
 Stephanie Ortiz (2007–08)
 Jeanette Sandoval (2008–09)
 Julian Dujarric (2008–2009)
 Daisy Fuentes (2009–10)
 Valery Ortiz (2010–16)
 Natasha Martinez (2016–19)
 Carolina Trejos (2019–present)

Origins 
American Latino TV was formerly known as Urban Latino TV and was originally produced by the AIM Tell-A-Vision Group (AIM TV), a New York City-based production and syndication company. AIM TV is a division of Artist and Idea Management and helped establish the business model of producing English language content for U.S. born Latinos beginning in 2001.

AIM TV was established in February 2000 by Robert G. Rose with the help of his production partner, Renzo Devia. AIM TV was the first television company to successfully produce, distribute and syndicate television programming targeting U.S. born Latinos, helping to spawn an industry that had not existed before (TV content in English, targeted to young, mostly U.S. born Latinos). 65% of U.S. Latinos are U.S. born according to U.S. Census data, but rarely if ever watch Spanish-language TV (according to Tomas Rivera Policy Inst. 1999).

In January 2008, the syndicated programs and the American Latino brand name were acquired by LATV Networks, the nation's first bilingual entertainment/music network distributed via digital multicast. The company gradually moved production to Los Angeles, California, where the show continues production of original episodes.

The broadcast syndication division (American Latino Syndication) continues to operate under the LATV Networks umbrella with sales and production offices located in New York City and Los Angeles, California.

Awards 
Imagen Award for Best National Informational Programming 2003, 2004, 2005
The Aurora Award – GOLD, Episode 204, 2004
The Aurora Award – Platinum Best of Show – Episode 201, 2004
Davey award, 2006

Notable features on American Latino TV 

Carlos Mencia
Cast of Ugly Betty
Celia Cruz
Cheech Marin
Tito Puente
Juanes
Daddy Yankee
Magic Under Glass
Miguel Angel Garcia
Eva Mendes
Freddy Rodriguez
Jimmy Smits
Joaquin Cortes
José Feliciano
Larry Harlow
Lorena Ochoa
Luis Castillo
Maná
Milka Duno
Perez Hilton
Rey Mysterio
Richard Carmona
Roberto Clemente
Shakira
Sonia Manzano
Tego Calderón
The Mars Volta
Tommy Chong
Tony Gonzalez
Uriel Saenz

References

External links 
 American Latino TV
 

Latin American culture
First-run syndicated television programs in the United States